Memorial Stadium is an outdoor baseball park in the western United States, located in Boise, Idaho.  The home field of the Boise Hawks of the independent Pioneer League, it has a current seating capacity of 3,452 on land owned by Ada County, adjacent to the Western Idaho Fairgrounds on the banks of the Boise River.

The stadium opened  in 1989, with several significant improvements over time.

Hawks' history
After moving from the Tri-Cities after the 1986 season, the renamed Boise Hawks continued as an independent in the Northwest League and played their first two seasons at Bill Wigle Field on the campus of Borah High School. They moved to Memorial Stadium in 1989 and became an affiliate of the California Angels organization in 1990. The Hawks' relationship with the Angels lasted for 11 years before a change to the Chicago Cubs in 2001. The Hawks made another affiliation change to the Colorado Rockies in 2015.

Since their arrival in 1987, the Hawks have won four league titles (1991, 1993–1995) and during the tenure of manager Tom Kotchman, the Hawks won 835 games.

In 2002, Steve McFarland became manager of the Hawks and since then, the Hawks have won two league championships and three divisional titles.

Previous teams
Starting in 1939, Boise was a longtime member of the Pioneer League. The teams were originally known as the Pilots, and later as the Yankees (1952–53) and Braves (1955–63). They played at Airway Park, about a half-mile (0.8 km) east of Albertsons Stadium, in Municipal Park (now Kristin Armstrong M.P.) in east Boise, now the site of the headquarters of the state's fish & game department. (photo - 1950s)  The present-day campus of Boise State University was the site of the original Boise airport, Varney Field, until 1940. In its final years, the ballpark was known as "Braves Field."

The last season of the Pioneer League in Boise was 1963 and the city went eleven summers without minor league baseball.

Boise's original team in the Northwest League was the Boise A's of 1975 and 1976. Fresh from Oakland Technical High School, future hall of famer Rickey Henderson was a member of the 1976 team as a   The independent Buckskins debuted in 1978, but after a  season, the team folded.  Both teams played their home games at Bill Wigle Field, then known as "Borah Field." Boise went without minor league baseball for eight summers until the Hawks arrived in 1987.

References

External links
Boise Hawks – Memorial Stadium map
Idaho Architecture Project – Hawks Memorial Stadium

Pioneer League (baseball) ballparks
Sports in Boise, Idaho
Baseball venues in Idaho
Buildings and structures in Boise, Idaho
Tourist attractions in Boise, Idaho